Peeter Mudist (19 April 1942, Tallinn – 6 December 2013) was an Estonian painter, sculptor, and print-maker whose works have received multiple awards.  He was also a member of the Estonian Artists' Union.

Early life
Born in 1942, in Tallinn, Mudist studied painting at the Estonian State Art Institute (now, the Estonian Academy of Arts) for four years, starting in 1963.

Later life and death
Mudist had Parkinson's disease in his later years. He died on the morning of 6 December 2013.

Awards
 Baltic Assembly Prize for Literature, the Arts and Science (1995)

References

1942 births
2013 deaths
20th-century Estonian painters
20th-century Estonian male artists
21st-century Estonian painters
Estonian people with disabilities
Estonian Academy of Arts alumni
Tallinn University of Technology alumni
Academic staff of Tallinn University
20th-century Estonian sculptors
Recipients of the Order of the White Star, 3rd Class
Artists from Tallinn